Chigwell is a town and civil parish in the Epping Forest District of Essex, England. It is part of the urban and metropolitan area of London, and is adjacent to the northern boundary of Greater London. It is on the Central line of the London Underground.

History

Toponymy
According to P. H. Reaney's Place-Names of Essex the name means 'Cicca's well', Cicca being an Anglo-Saxon personal name. In medieval sources the name appears with a variety of spellings including "Cinghe uuella" and Chikewelle". Folk etymology has sought to derive the name from a lost "king's well", supposed to have been to the south-east of the parish near the border of what is now the London Borough of Redbridge. There were several medicinal springs in Chigwell Row documented by Miller Christy in his book History of the mineral waters and medicinal springs of the county of Essex, published in 1910. The 18th-century historian Nathaniel Salmon stated that the "-well" element in the name derives from Anglo-Saxon weald (wood).

The land registration map of Redbridge Council shows "Chig Well (site of)" as being located to the rear of the house located at 67 Brocket Way, Chigwell.

Economic development
Traditionally a rural farming community, but now largely suburban, Chigwell was mentioned in the Domesday Book. It referred to by Charles Dickens in his novel Barnaby Rudge: A Tale of the Riots of 'Eighty; the Maypole Inn is based on the King's Head inn, though the name was taken from the Maypole public house in Chigwell Row. It is likely Dickens was aware of both hostelries, since he frequently visited Chigwell, which he described in a letter to John Forster as "the greatest place in the world ... Such a delicious old inn opposite the churchyard ... such beautiful forest scenery ... such an out of the way rural place...".

Local government
The Chigwell civil parish was part of Epping Rural District from 1894 to 1933, with local government split between Chigwell Parish Council, Epping Rural District Council and Essex County Council. Following a county review order in 1933, Chigwell formed together with Buckhurst Hill and Loughton the Chigwell Urban District, with the Chigwell Urban District Council replacing both the parish and rural district councils. When Greater London was created in 1965 a small, more densely populated section to the southeast was transferred to the London Borough of Redbridge; this area is now known as the Manford estate and continues to be within the Chigwell post town. The rest of Chigwell Urban District was incorporated into the Epping Forest District in 1974. Parish councils were re-established for Chigwell and Loughton, and for the first time in Buckhurst Hill, in 1996.

RAF Chigwell
From 1933 to 1958 there was an RAF presence at Roding Valley Meadows (near what is now the David Lloyd Leisure Centre). It served first to provide barrage balloon protection during the Second World War and was involved in the rollout of Britain's coastal nuclear early warning system during the Cold War. In 1953 it briefly housed the RAF contingent taking part in the Coronation celebrations. Some of the RAF Chigwell site is now part of the Local Nature Reserve, Roding Valley Meadows LNR.

Governance
The local council of the civil parish is Chigwell Parish Council. The parish council originally existed from 1894 to 1933, and was created again in 1996. The parish council offices are located on Hainault Road. Councillors are elected from three wards: Grange Hill, Chigwell Row and Chigwell Village. Local councillors are also elected to Epping Forest District Council and Essex County Council.

Geography

The hamlet of Chigwell Row lies towards the east of Chigwell, near Lambourne; this part of the parish is well forested and mostly rural. Grange Hill is the area around the junction of Manor Road and Fencepiece Road/Hainault Road, extending as far as the boundary with Redbridge including the Limes Farm estate. Chigwell has a population of around 12,500 and is generally considered a wealthy area, which since the TV series Essex Wives. The area is characterised by large suburban houses, notably in Manor Road, Hainault Road and Chigwell High Road, which featured in the popular English situation comedy Birds of a Feather (although many of the outside locations used in that programme were not in Chigwell).

Education

Schools in the area include Chigwell Primary Academy, Limes Farm Infants School & Nursery, Limes Farm Junior School, Guru Gobind Singh Khalsa College, West Hatch High School and Chigwell School, a private school, which was founded from a bequest by Samuel Harsnett, Archbishop of York, in 1629, among whose past pupils are William Penn, who later went on to found Pennsylvania, and actor Sir Ian Holm. The diarist John Aubrey recorded that it was at Chigwell School that Penn had a mystical vision, which influenced his later conversion to Quakerism. The original 17th-century schoolroom where Penn was taught still stands, and is now the school library.

Culture

Until May 2012 Tottenham Hotspur Football Club had its training facilities in the area, when they moved to a new facility in Enfield, north east London, However the club still runs training sessions for local youth on the Limes Farm estate through the summer months. Many past and present players and staff have homes in the area. Leyton Orient Football Club also have a training ground in Chigwell, adjacent to Chigwell School's fields.

A David Lloyd Leisure Centre is situated off Roding Road by the M11 motorway, which contains indoor and outdoor tennis courts, swimming pools and gymnasium. Also in the area are a Holmes Place Health Club, Topgolf playing Centre and Chigwell Golf Club. Chigwell Cricket Club is based at the Old Chigwellians Club in Roding Lane. Chigwell also plays host to the Old Loughtonians Hockey Club. The town is also included in a number of London loop walks, which start in the city and pass through the outskirts of the capital.

There are two pubs, The King William IV and the Two Brewers.

Ye Olde King's Head, which was operated as a pub until 2011 is said to be the Maypole Inn in Dickens' Barnaby Rudge. The building was subsequently sold to local resident Lord Sugar's property company Amsprop which now leases the Grade 1 building to the Sheesh Turkish restaurant.

Until their closure in 2002, Chigwell had night clubs, known collectively as the Epping Forest Country Club. There is a Local Nature Reserve at Roding Valley Meadows off Roding Lane which follows the River Roding up to Loughton.

The TV series Birds of a Feather was set in Chigwell.

Transport

All bus services are Transport for London services, except the 804. Route 150 just penetrates into Chigwell Row. Routes 362 and 462 serve only Grange Hill. Route 275 just passes through Tomswood Road and the westernmost section of Manor Road. Chigwell is served by Chigwell station and Grange Hill station (further south bordering Hainault), both on the Central line of the London Underground. For a more frequent service to London there are also nearby Buckhurst Hill, Woodford, Loughton and Hainault stations as services between Grange Hill and Woodford are limited to three trains per hour in each direction, with an increased service during morning peak hours.

Notable people 

Thomas Edwards, recipient of the Victoria Cross for actions at the Battle of Tamai, is buried in the churchyard of St Mary's.
Sally Gunnell, athlete, pupil at West Hatch High School
Admiral Sir Eliab Harvey, Royal Navy officer, lived at Rolls (demolished 1953)
Simon Harris, music producer
 Scott Kashket (born 1996), England, striker for Wycombe Wanderers
Harriet King, Victorian poet
Lieutenant-General Sir Francis Lloyd (1853-1926), lived latterly at Rolls Park in Chigwell.
Bobby Moore, footballer, captain of the 1966 FIFA World Cup-winning England team
Geoff Hurst, member of 1966 FIFA World Cup-winning team, also lived in the town while at West Ham United  
Lieutenant Colonel Augustus Charles Newman, recipient of the Victoria Cross for actions at the St Nazaire Raid, was born in the town.
Ronnie O'Sullivan, snooker player
George Shillibeer, creator of the London omnibus, plaque at St Mary's parish church
Alan Sugar, billionaire entrepreneur, former owner of Amstrad, host of The Apprentice.
General Sir John Watson, recipient of the Victoria Cross for actions at Lucknow during the Indian Mutiny, was born in the town.
Vicki Michelle Actress, born in Chigwell.
Dave Gahan singer, member of groupe Depeche Mode born in Chigwell.

References

External links

 Chigwell Parish Council website

 
Civil parishes in Essex
Towns in Essex
Epping Forest District